In 1992 Tipperary competed in the National Hurling League and the Munster Championship.
It was Babs Keating's sixth year in charge of the team with Colm Bonnar named as team captain. The team were sponsored by National Irish Bank which appeared on the jerseys. In the Munster championship, Tipperary lost in the semi-final to Cork by three points and exited the championship after one match.

National Hurling League

Division 1A table

1992 Munster Senior Hurling Championship

Awards
Tipperary won one All Star Award with forward Michael Cleary picking up his second award.

References

External links
Tipperary GAA Archives 1992
1992 Teams and Results at Premierview
Cork v Tipperary 7 June 1992 at YouTube

Tipp
Tipperary county hurling team seasons